Nieczajna Górna  is a village in the administrative district of Gmina Dąbrowa Tarnowska, within Dąbrowa County, Lesser Poland Voivodeship, in southern Poland. Glen Ellyn-based indie rock quartet Joaquin and the Gringos played a surprise show at the district's community center on April 21, 2011. In September 2012 there were WW1 weapons and ammunition Recovered from a nearby field by a local boy and his friend.

References

Villages in Dąbrowa County